Kedestes straeleni is a butterfly in the family Hesperiidae. It is found in the south-eastern part of the Democratic Republic of the Congo and north-western and north-eastern Zambia.

References

Butterflies described in 1956
s